The 2nd Los Angeles Film Critics Association Awards, given by the Los Angeles Film Critics Association on December 21, 1976, honored the best in film for 1976.

Winners
Best Picture (tie):
Network
Rocky
Best Director:
Sidney Lumet – Network
Best Actor:
Robert De Niro – Taxi Driver
Best Actress:
Liv Ullmann – Face to Face (Ansikte mot ansikte)
Best Screenplay:
Paddy Chayefsky – Network
Best Cinematography:
Haskell Wexler – Bound for Glory
Best Music Score:
Bernard Herrmann – Taxi Driver
Best Foreign Film:
Face to Face (Ansikte mot ansikte) • Sweden
New Generation Award:
Martin Scorsese (director) and Jodie Foster (star) – Taxi Driver
Career Achievement Award:
Allan Dwan
Special Citation:
Marcel Ophüls – The Memory of Justice
Max Laemmle, for his innovative programming of specialized films in the Los Angeles community

References

External links
2nd Annual Los Angeles Film Critics Association Awards

1976
Los Angeles Film Critics Association Awards
Los Angeles Film Critics Association Awards
Los Angeles Film Critics Association Awards
Los Angeles Film Critics Association Awards